Token of Darkness is the eleventh novel by American author, Amelia Atwater-Rhodes and is the sixth novel in the Den of Shadows. The novel was published on February 9, 2010. "The Raven" by Edgar Allan Poe is featured in the book.

Summary
Cooper Blake is a high school football player who dreamed of going pro until a car accident that destroyed it all. Now he sees this ghost named Samantha, who wants a body. Intent on helping her Cooper goes to the library to find a way to help her. Along the way he meets Delilah and Brent, both who know of Samantha and realize the danger Cooper is in. Intent on helping him they must discover more about Samantha and where she came from, which puts all of them in more danger than they can handle.

References

2010 American novels
Novels by Amelia Atwater-Rhodes
Nyeusigrube
Den of Shadows
Delacorte Press books